Wonderful! Wonderful! is an album by organist Joey DeFrancesco which was recorded in 2012 and released on the HighNote label.

Reception

On All About Jazz, Dan Bilawski noted "This date is essentially a blowing session with solos aplenty, but these guys never phone it in. They clearly delight in exploring the material, playing off one another and, in the case of DeFrancesco and Coryell, letting their envious chops off the leash". In JazzTimes, Bill Milkowski wrote: "It’s an inspired pairing with results ranging from sublime to positively pyrotechnic".

Track listing 
 "Wonderful! Wonderful!" (Sherman Edwards, Ben Raleigh) – 7:07		
 "Five Spot After Dark" (Benny Golson) – 6:01
 "Wagon Wheels" (Billy Hill, Peter DeRose) – 8:47
 "Solitude" (Duke Ellington, Eddie DeLange, Irving Mills) – 7:12
 "Joey D" (Larry Coryell) – 8:49
 "Love Letters" (Victor Young, Edward Heyman) – 6:36
 "Old Folks" (Willard Robison, Dedette Lee Hill) – 5:22
 "JLJ Blues" (Joey DeFrancesco) – 8:21

Personnel 
Joey DeFrancesco – Hammond B3, trumpet
Larry Coryell – guitar
Jimmy Cobb – drums

References 

Joey DeFrancesco albums
2012 albums
HighNote Records albums
Albums recorded at Van Gelder Studio